Cast Two Shadows is a historical novel by Ann Rinaldi, a part of the Great Episodes series; it is told in first-person.

Plot
It is 1780, in the midst of the American Revolution, in Camden, South Carolina, and fourteen-year-old Caroline Whitaker, her step mother Sarah and her bratty older half-sister Georgia Ann are confined to one small room of their spacious Southern plantation home. Caroline is the light-skinned daughter of the plantation's owner and a slave who has been raised by Mama Sarah. British soldiers, led by Colonel Rawdon are occupying the place. The Colonel is also courting Georgia Ann. 

Caroline and her Negra caretaker, who is also her grandmother, Miz Melindy, travel to get her 'almost' brother Johnny. He converts into an American patriot, after being whipped and spanked by a British officer for not handing over his second most prized horse- Grey Goose, aside from the most thoroughbred blooded mare in all of St. Mark's Parish, Fearnaught. Johnny's horses make many conflicts throughout the novel, including Caroline's sore wound over Kit's dab and dabbing.

1998 American novels
1998 children's books
American children's novels
Children's historical novels
Novels by Ann Rinaldi
Novels set in South Carolina
Fiction set in 1780
Novels set in the 1780s
Kershaw County, South Carolina
Novels set during the American Revolutionary War
American historical novels